Robert Fraisse (born 1940) is a French cinematographer born in Paris. He was nominated for an Academy Award for his work on the film The Lover. Fraisse has been a regular collaborator for directors like Jean-Jacques Annaud and Nick Cassavetes.

Filmography

References

External links

1940 births
Cinematographers from Paris
Living people